Podshivalov is a Russian masculine surname, its feminine counterpart is Podshivalova. It may refer to
Aleksandr Podshivalov (born 1964), Russian association football coach and former player
Dmitri Podshivalov (born 1981), Russian football player

Russian-language surnames